The Bank of France (French: Banque de France), headquartered in Paris, is the central bank of France. Founded in 1800, it began as a private institution for managing state debts and issuing notes. It is responsible for the accounts of the French government, managing the accounts and the facilitation of payments for the Treasury and some public companies. On 1 January 1999, France adopted the euro and the Bank of France became a founder member of the Eurosystem. Until then, it has been responsible for the former national currency, the French franc.

Today, it is an independent institution, and it has been a member of the Eurosystem of central banks since 1999. This consists of the European Central Bank (ECB), and the national central banks (NCBs) of all European Union (EU) members. Its three main missions, as defined by its statuses, are to drive the French monetary strategy, ensure financial stability and provide services to households, small and medium businesses and the French state. 

François Villeroy de Galhau has served as Governor of the Banque de France since 1 November 2015.

History

Central banking before the Bank of France
The Kingdom of France's first experiment with a central bank was the Banque Générale (Banque Générale Privée or "General Private Bank"), set up by John Law at the behest of the Duke of Orléans after the death of Louis XIV. Law received the bank's 20-year charter in May 1716 and its stock consisted of 1,200 shares valued at 5,000 livres apiece. It was meant to stimulate France's stagnant economy and pay down its staggering national debt acquired from Louis XIV's wars, including the War of the Spanish Succession. It was nationalized in December 1718 at Law's request and formally renamed the Banque Royale a month later. It saw great initial success, increasing industry 60% in two years, but Law's mercantilist policies saw him seek to establish large monopolies, leading to the Mississippi bubble. The bubble would ultimately burst in 1720, and on 27 November of that year, the Banque Royale officially closed.

The collapse of the Mississippi Company and the Banque Royale tarnished the word banque ("bank") so much that France abandoned central banking for almost a century, possibly precipitating Louis XVI's economic crisis and the French Revolution. Successors such as la Caisse d'escompte (from 1776 to 1793) and la Caisse d'escompte du commerce (from 1797 to 1803) used the word "caisse" instead, until Napoleon retook the term with la Banque de France ("Bank of France") in 1800.

Bank of France
In 1803, financial power in France was in the hands of fifteen members of the Haute Banque, when the  shareholders' meeting ratified the appointment of a “Council of Regency” composed of: 

Jean-Frédéric Perregaux
Guillaume Mallet
Jean-Barthélémy Le Couteulx de Canteleu. 
Joseph Hugues-Lagarde
Jacques-Rose Récamier
Jean-Pierre Germain (died 1803)
Carié-Bézard
Pierre-Léon Basterrèche
Jean-Auguste Sévène
Alexandre Barrillon
Georges-Antoine Ricard
Georges-Victor Demautort
Claude Perier
Pierre-Nicolas Perrée-Duhamel
Jacques-Florent Robillard
Jean-Conrad Hottinguer

These high bankers were deeply involved in the agitations leading up to the French Revolution. When the revolutionary violence got out of hand, they orchestrated the rise of Napoleon, whom they regarded as the restorer of order. As a reward for their support, Napoleon, in 1800, gave the bankers a monopoly over French finance by giving them control of the new Bank of France (Banque de France). Banker Claude Périer drafted the first statutes and Emmanuel Crétet was the first governor. For the first fifteen years it was the sole issuer of bank notes in Paris, and this privilege was extended to other financially important cities and the rest of the country by 1848.  

The Bank was also instrumental in the creation of the Latin Monetary Union (LMU) in 1865. The countries of France, Belgium, Italy, and the Swiss Confederation established the LMU franc as a common bimetallic currency.

In World War I, the Bank sold short-term Treasury bonds abroad to help pay for wartime expenditures. France abandoned the gold standard shortly after the outbreak of war. Debts amounted to approximately 42 billion francs by 1919. Following the war, the Bank sought to re-establish the gold standard and acquired capital from a number of American and British banking syndicates to defend the franc from exchange-rate fluctuations. The Bank also began to hoard gold reserves and, at its peak, held 28.3 percent of the world's gold stock (only behind the United States at 30.4 percent). Some scholars have asserted that this gold accumulation was a contributing factor to the Great Depression. Under Émile Moreau, Governor from 1926 to 1930, the Bank consolidated gold reserves created a stabilization insurance fund (fonds de stabilisation), and tested new monetary policies in the wake of a global depression.

In World War II, the Bank oversaw the transfer of gold reserves overseas, which mainly included Canada, the United States, and the French overseas territories. In 1945, the Bank was nationalized by Charles de Gaulle and became a state-owned institution. Existing shareholders received bonds to replace their shares in the company. 

In 1993, the Bank of France was again reformed when it obtained independence from the state. It sought to establish credibility by promising to adhere to the single mandate of price stability. Jean-Claude Trichet, Governor from 1993 to 2003, was the final Governor of the Bank until the establishment of the European Central Bank (ECB) in June 1998. Today, the ECB sets monetary policy and oversees price stability for all countries in the Eurozone, including France.

European System of Central Banks

On 1 June 1998, a new institution was created, the European Central Bank (ECB), charged with steering the single monetary policy for the euro. The body formed by the ECB, and the national central banks (NCB) of all the member states of the European Union, constitute the European System of Central Banks (ESCB).  According to the Maastrict Treaty, the Bank would oversee the functioning of the payment system and conduct independent research on the French economy, while the newly established European Central Bank conducted monetary policy for the entire Eurozone. The French franc was replaced by the Euro on 1 January 1999.

Following the financial crisis of 2007-2008, the Bank of France implemented quantitative easing for the account of the ECB.

In 2010, the French government's Autorité de la concurrence (the department in charge of regulating competition) fined eleven banks, including Bank of France, the sum of €384,900,000 for colluding to charge unjustified fees on check processing, especially for extra fees charged during the transition from paper check transfer to "Exchanges Check-Image" electronic transfer.

The Bank recently established a "Lab", located on the Rue Réaumur in Paris, where start-ups and small businesses work on blockchain, artificial intelligence, and virtual reality. The Bank is the first to set up a blockchain system.

Timeline
 1800, creation of the Bank of France by Napoleon Bonaparte
 14 April 1803, the new Bank received its first official charter granting it the exclusive right to issue paper money in Paris for fifteen years.
 22 April 1806, a new law replaced the Central Committee with a Governor and two Deputy Governors. All three were appointed by the Emperor.
 Decree dated 16 January 1808, set out the "Basic Statutes", which were to govern the Bank's operations until 1936.
 Decree on 6 March 1808, authorized the Bank to purchase the former mansion of the Count of Toulouse in the rue de la Vrillière in Paris for its headquarters.
 1808–1936, the Bank's notes became legal tender; expansion of the branch network
 1936–1945, nationalisation
 1973, rewriting of the Bank's statutes
 1993, a reform granted the Bank independence, in order to ensure price stability, regardless of domestic politics.  This reform cleared the path for the European monetary union.
 1998, entered into the European System of Central Banks
 2002, Implementation of the Euro bank notes and coins in France
 2003, Christian Noyer becomes governor of the Bank of France
 2008, implements quantitative easing to manage the financial crisis
 2015, François Villeroy de Galhau replaces Christian Noyer. The Bank distributes dividends to the French state of 4.5 billion euros in 2016, 5.0 billion euros in 2017 and 6.1 billion euros in 2019.

Management of the Covid-19 crisis 
With the onset of the Covid-19 pandemic and the ensuing economic crisis, the Eurosystem resolved to inject €3 trillion of liquidity into banks, allowing them in turn to support households and businesses, particularly with regard to urgent cash flow needs. In addition to membership in the Eurosystem, the Banque de France is in charge of credit mediation. This service, which has been in very high demand during the crisis, provides assistance to companies facing difficulties in their relations with financial institutions. The Banque de France manages procedures to resolve overindebtedness, and while its premises are no longer open to the public, requests continue to be processed.

Activities
The Bank of France is responsible for three missions: monetary strategy, financial steadiness and services to the economy.

Monetary strategy 
The Bank of France contributes to the design of the monetary policy of the euro zone (through macroeconomic research and forecast and by taking part in the deliberations on ECB decisions) and implements it in France.

It is also the guardian of currency: it prints euro bank notes (it is the largest printer of euro notes) and manages the circulation of bank notes and coins. It also participates in the fight against counterfeit money, by training bank employees, merchants, police, etc.

The Bank of France establishes France's balance of payments and manages part of the foreign exchange reserves of the ECB.

Financial steadiness 
The Bank of France is responsible for overseeing the French financial sector, through its subsidiary ACPR (Autorité de Contrôle Prudentiel et de Résolution). It assesses risks and weaknesses of the financial system (in 2018, the French financial sector is composed of 777 banks and 827 insurance and mutual insurance companies).

It also monitors payment systems and means, and publishes the Financial Stability Review (Revue de la Stabilité Financière).

Services to the economy 
The Bank of France provides services to households, businesses and the French state.

Households
The Bank of France is in charge of offering services households in severe financial difficulty. This includes the management of over-indebtedness (one of the major tasks of the local branches of the bank), and the guarantee to an access to basic banking services for everyone, such as the right to a basic bank account.

It is also in charge of financial and economic education of the general public, by developing an economic culture among specific populations (like youngsters and households in severe financial difficulty). This includes sensitizing high school students, providing online information and educational services, training social workers and the launch of the French Cité de l'économie et de la monnaie (Citéco), a museum based in the 17th district of Paris, in 2019.

Businesses
The Bank of France provides company ratings for non-listed companies, which can for instance be used by business leaders to obtain credit from their bank. It also manages credit mediation (mediation between companies and their banks, their credit insurers, etc.) and proposes support to very small businesses (advice for their development and needs). The Bank of France publishes a number of economic surveys, national and regional statistics, destined to businesses.

Governance
The governor of the Bank of France is appointed by the president and is, as of 2019, François Villeroy de Galhau, since 1 November 2015. He presides over the Bank's General Council, the body responsible for deliberating on all matters relating to non-Eurosystem activities. The first deputy governor is Denis Beau and the second deputy governor is Sylvie Goulard.

Key figures
In 2019, the main key figures of the Bank of France are as follows: 
 	
 Number of full-time employees: 9,857
 Regional branches: 95	
Profit before tax : 6.5 billion euros
 Dividend distributed to the French state : 6.1 billion euros
 Gold reserves: 106.1 billion euros
 Gold stock in France: 2,436 tons

See also

Economy of France
Euro
French franc
Governor of the Bank de France

References

Further reading

 Accominotti, Olivier. "The Sterling Trap: Foreign Reserves Management at the Bank of France, 1928-19". European Review of Economic History 13, No. 3 (2009). 
Baubeau, Patrice. "The Bank of France's balance sheets database, 1840–1998: an introduction to 158 years of central banking." Financial History Review 25, No. 2 (2018). 
 Bazot, Guillaume, Michael D. Bordo, and Eric Monnet. "The Price of Stability: The Balance Sheet Policy of the Banque de France and the Gold Standard (1880–1914)." NBER Working Papers. Number 20554. October 2014. 
 Bignon, Vincent and Marc Flandreau. "The Other Way: A Narrative History of Banque de France." In Sveriges Riksbank and the History of Central Banking, eds. Tor Jacobson and Daniel Waldenstrom. Cambridge: Cambridge University Press, 2018.
 Bordo, Michael D. and Pierre-Cyrille Hautcoeur. "Why Didn't France Follow the British Stabilisation after World War I?" European Review of Economic History 11, no. 1 (2007): 3-37.
 Bouvier, Jean. "The Banque de France and the State from 1850 to the Present Day." in Fausto Vicarelli, et al. eds., Central banks' independence in historical perspective (Walter de Gruyter, 1988) pp. 73–104.
 Du Camp, Maxime and Raphael-Georges Lévy. La Banque de France et son Histoire. Mono, 2017.
 Duchaussoy, Vincent. "Une Banque publique ? 1936 ou la mutation initiée de la Banque de France." Revue historique 681 (2017): 55–72.
 Flandreau, Marc. "Central Bank Cooperation in Historical Perspective: A Sceptical View." The Economic History Review, New Series, 50, no. 4 (1997): 735–63. [www.jstor.org/stable/2599884]
 Flandreau, Marc, 1996b, The French Crime of 1873: An Essay on the Emergence of the International Gold Standard, 
 Flandreau, Marc. The Glitter of Gold: France, Bimetallism, and the Emergence of the International Gold Standard, 1848–1873. New York: Oxford University Press, 2003.
Flandreau, Marc. "Was the Latin Monetary Union a Franc Zone?." In International Monetary Systems in Historical Perspective, ed. J. Reis (1995).
 Gille, Bertrand. La Banque en France au xixe siècle : recherches historiques, Genève: Droz, 1970.
 
 Irwin, Douglas A. "The French Gold Sink and the Great Deflation of 1929–32." Dartmouth College.  
Leclercq, Yves. La Banque supérieure : La Banque de France de 1800 à 1914. Paris, Éditions Classique Garnier, 2010.
 Monnet, Éric. Controlling Credit: Central Banking and the Planned Economy in Postwar France, 1948-1973. Cambridge: Cambridge University Press, 2018.
 Mouré, Kenneth. Managing the Franc Poincaré: Economic Understanding and Political Constraint in French Monetary Policy, 1928–1936. Cambridge University Press (1991).
Nishimura, Shizuya. "The French Provincial Banks, the Banque De France, and Bill Finance, 1890-1913." The Economic History Review, New Series, 48, no. 3 (1995): 536-54
 Jacoud, Gilles. "Crises et Apprentissage: La Banque de France en 1848," Entreprises et Histoire (Dec. 2012) Issue 69, pp 27–37
 Plessis, Alain. "The history of banks in France." in Pohl, Manfred, and Sabine Freitag, eds. Handbook on the history of European banks (Edward Elgar Publishing, 1994) pp: 185–296. online
 Plessis, Alain. Histoires de la Banque de France. Paris: Albin Michel, 2015.
 Plessis, Alain. La Banque de France et ses deux cents actionnaires sous le Second Empire. Geneva: Droz, 1982.
 Servais, Édmond. La Banque de France. Son histoire, son organisation, ses opérations. Cours Servais, 1949.
 Sicsic, Pierre. "Was the franc poincare deliberately undervalued?," Explorations in Economic History 29(1) (1992): 69-92.*  Szramkiewicz, Romuald. Les Régents et censeurs de la Banque de France nommés sous le Consulat et l'Empire. Genève: Droz, 1974.
 Yee, Robert. "The Bank of France and the Gold Dependency: Observations on the Bank’s Weekly Balance Sheets and Reserves, 1898–1940." Johns Hopkins University: Studies in Applied Economics. No. 128.

External links
  Official site of Bank of France
  Beginnings of Banque de France The directors of Bank of France between 1800 and 1815.

  Banque de France, Minitel Connection
 

Economy of France
Banks established in 1800
 
France
France
France
Banknote printing companies
French companies established in 1800
Financial regulatory authorities of France
France